A Hishaku is a tool for scooping water or soup. It has a vessel shape with a handle.

Shape 
Hishaku are generally made of curved objects with handles, but in ancient times, hishakus made of Gourd were used as hishakus.

Originally, the name "hishaku" was derived from "hisako," which refers to the bottle gourd used since ancient times for scooping water, which became "hisaku" and then "hishaku", and then the kanji were chosen by folk etymology. It is also written with the single kanji 斗

The ones in Shinto shrines Chōzuyas (places for washing hands and rinsing mouths to purify body and soul) are made of Trees or Bambuseaes, but there are many different sizes and materials depending on the use and purpose, and some are made of Metals or Plastics.

The hishaku used for tea ceremony is different in size and length from the general hishaku.
。

Things about Hishaku 

 When a Funayūrei appears, it helps to give a hishaku with a loose bottom.
 A hishaku with a loose bottom is also used for praying for easy childbirth. It is said to mean that the baby will be born as easily as the water drains away.
 Izumo-taisha uses a hishaku made of raw gourd cut into a semicircle with a hemp handle for the offering of sacred water at the Tsume-peeling Festival. This is said to be related to the spiritual power of gourd and hemp.。

See also 

 Shinto shrine
 Chōzuya

References 

Japanese tea utensils
Shinto religious objects
Pages with unreviewed translations